Roche-Dinkeloo, otherwise known as Kevin Roche John Dinkeloo and Associates LLC (KRJDA), is an architectural firm based in Hamden, Connecticut founded in 1966.

About
The principal designers were 1982 Pritzker Prize laureate Kevin Roche (June 1922 – 2019), with John Dinkeloo—a graduate of the University of Michigan—as the expert in construction and technology.

Roche and Dinkeloo both previously worked with Eero Saarinen. Almost all buildings built by Roche are with this firm, and they exhibit his particular architecture and aesthetic, although it has changed wildly throughout the past 40 years. Earlier buildings were characterized by massive facades and experimentation with exposed steel and concrete, while more recent buildings emphasize a clean, glassy look suggesting futuristic and green architecture. The firm also built in postmodern and historicist styles during the early 1990s.

"KRJDA is engaged in major projects throughout the United States, Europe and Asia and provides complete master planning, programming, architectural design, interior design, working drawings, specification and construction administration services. The firm has designed a variety of institutional and corporate projects including 38 corporate headquarters, three hotel/apartment buildings, eight museums, numerous research facilities, theaters, schools, factories, performing arts centers, houses and the Central Park Zoo in New York. For the past 42 years, he has been the architect for the master plan and expansion of the Metropolitan Museum of Art in New York, designing all of its new wings and installing many of its collections."

The firm received the American Institute of Architects 1974 Architectural Firm Award and in 1995 the firm was the recipient of the American Institute of Architect's 25-Year Award for the Ford Foundation Headquarters in New York City. In 1982, Kevin Roche received the Pritzker Prize and in 1993, he received the AIA Gold Medal. In 2015 Kevin Roche received the George M. White Award from the American Architectural Foundation.

Kevin Roche has been referred to as the "first [architect] to see architecture and nature as one."

The firm relaunched in 2020 as Roche Modern under Director Jerry Boryca and Managing Director Eamon Roche. The firm is now based out of New Haven, CT.

Projects
KRJDA has completed over 200 projects in the US and internationally. These include 8 museums, 38 institutional and corporate headquarters, 7 research laboratories, conference and performing arts centers, theaters, and campus buildings for 6 separate universities. KRJDA maintains their office in Hamden, Connecticut.

Film

A feature documentary about Kevin Roche and his work, called Kevin Roche: The Quiet Architect was released in 2017. It is directed by Irish filmmaker (ex-architecture student) Mark Noonan whose 2015 debut feature You're Ugly Too starred Aidan Gillen and was met with critical acclaim.

Notable buildings

1968 - The Ford Foundation Center for Social Justice, New York, NY
1969 - Oakland Museum of California, Oakland, CA
1969 - Administration, Student Union & Physical Education Buildings, RIT, Rochester, NY
1969 - The Knights of Columbus Building Headquarters, New Haven, CT
1969 - United States Post Office, Columbus, IN
1969 - Aetna Life and Casualty Company Computer Headquarters, Hartford, CT
1971 - Power Center for the Performing Arts, University of Michigan, Ann Arbor, MI
1973 - Center for the Arts, Wesleyan University, Middletown, CT
1974 - Fine Arts Center, University of Massachusetts Amherst, Amherst, MA
1974 - The Pyramids (Indianapolis) College Life Insurance Company of America Headquarters, Indianapolis, IN
1974 - Worcester Plaza, Worcester, MA
1975 - One United Nations Plaza and ONE UN New York Hotel, New York, NY
1978 - John Deere World Headquarters West Office Building, Moline, IL
1979 - Denver Performing Arts Complex, Denver, CO
1982 - One Summit Square, Fort Wayne, IN
1982 - The Corporate Center, Danbury, CT
1982 - Moudy Visual Arts and Communication Building, Texas Christian University, Fort Worth, TX
1983 - Two United Nations Plaza and ONE UN New York Hotel, New York, NY
1983 - General Foods Corporate Headquarters, Ryebrook, NY
1985 - Cummins Corporate Office Building, Columbus, IN
1985 - DeWitt Wallace Decorative Arts Museum, Williamsburg, VA
1986 - Conoco Inc. Petroleum Headquarters, Houston, TX
1988 - Central Park Zoo, New York, NY
1988 - Bouygues World Headquarters, Saint-Quentin-Yvelines, France	
1989 - Leo Burnett Building Company Headquarters, Chicago, IL	
1990 - 750 Seventh Avenue, New York, NY	
1990 - Metropolitano Office Building, Madrid, Spain	
1992 - J.P. Morgan Tower, New York, NY	
1993 - Corning Incorporated Corporate Headquarters, Corning, NY	
1993 - Merck & Co. Inc. Headquarters, Whitehouse Station, NJ	
1993 - Bank of America Plaza (Atlanta) GA	
1993 - Borland International Corporate Headquarters, Scotts Valley, Ca	
1993 - Tanjong and Binariang Headquarters/Menara Maxis, Kuala Lumpur, Malaysia	
1994 - Pontiac Marina Millenia Tower and The Ritz-Carlton Millenia Singapore 
1995 - Dai-ichi Life Headquarters/ Norinchukin Bank Headquarters, DN Tower 21, Tokyo, Japan	
1997 - Zesiger Sports and Fitness Center, Massachusetts Institute of Technology, Cambridge, MA	
1997 - Shiodome City Center, Tokyo, Japan	
1997 - Helen and Martin Kimmel Center for University Life/ Skirball Center for the Performing Arts, New York University, New York, NY	
1997 - Lucent Technologies, Lisle, IL/Naperville, IL	
2000 - Ciudad Grupo Santander, Madrid, Spain	
2001 - Securities and Exchange Commission Headquarters, Washington, D.C.	
2002 - Bouygues S.A. Holding Company Headquarters, Paris, France	
2003 - 1101 New York Avenue, Washington, D.C.	
2005 - Lafayette Tower, Washington, D.C.	
2009 - David S. Ingalls Rink Restoration and Addition, Yale University, New Haven, CT
2010 - Convention Centre Dublin, Dublin, Ireland (2010)
2011 - New Galleries for the Art of the Arab Lands, Turkey, Iran, Central Asia, and Later South Asia at the Metropolitan Museum of Art
2012 - American Painting Galleries in the American Wing at the Metropolitan Museum of Art
2014 - Renovations to United Nations Development Corporation
2018 - 200/250 Massachusetts Ave Capitol Crossing
2020 - Expansion at Museum of Jewish Heritage

References

External links
 Firm Website: Kevin Roche John Dinkeloo and Associates LLC

Architecture firms based in Connecticut